Maharishi Markandeshwar University may refer to one of several universities in India:

 Maharishi Markandeshwar University, Mullana, a deemed university in Haryana
 Maharishi Markandeshwar University, Sadopur, a private university in Haryana
 Maharishi Markandeshwar University, Solan, a private university in Himachal Pradesh